In mathematics, the predual of an object D is an object P whose dual space is D.

For example, the predual of the space of bounded operators is the space of trace class operators, and the predual of the space L∞(R) of essentially bounded functions on R is the Banach space L1(R) of integrable functions..

Abstract algebra
Functional analysis